The Naked Island is a Japanese black-and-white film from 1960, directed by Kaneto Shindō. The film is notable for having almost no spoken dialogue.

Plot
The film depicts a small family, a husband and wife and two sons, struggling to get by on a tiny island in the Seto Inland Sea on the island of Sukune in Mihara, Hiroshima, over the course of a year. They are the island's only occupants, and survive by farming. They must repeatedly carry the water for their plants and themselves in a row boat from a neighboring island.

When the boys catch a large fish, the family travels to Onomichi by ferry, where they sell it to a fishmonger, then eat at a modern restaurant.

While the parents are away from the island, the older son falls ill. The desperate father runs to find a doctor to come to treat his son, but when they arrive, the boy is already dead. After the boy's funeral, which is attended by his classmates from his school on the neighboring island, the family resumes their hard life, with very limited opportunity for grief.

Production
Director and scriptwriter Kaneto Shindo decided to make this film because he wanted to make a film without any dialogue. The independent production company Kindai Eiga Kyokai was close to bankruptcy at the time this film was made, and Shindo sank his last funds into making the film. The film's financial success saved the company.

The lead actor Taiji Tonoyama was suffering from severe liver disease due to alcohol dependence, but recovered his health because there was no alcohol available near the filming location. These events were later dramatized in Shindo's biopic about Tonoyama, By Player.

In his last published book before he died, Shindo noted that the film's premise of carrying water to the island is false, because the crop shown being watered in the film, sweet potatoes, do not actually need extensive watering.

Shindo deliberately made the actors carry heavily-loaded buckets of water so that the yokes they were using would be seen to bend, symbolizing the harshness of their lives.

The island location in the film is an uninhabited island called Sukune off the coast of a larger island called Sagishima, part of Mihara, Hiroshima.

Reception
In 1961, the film won the Grand Prix (in a tie with Grigori Chukhrai's Chistoye nebo) at the 2nd Moscow International Film Festival, at which Luchino Visconti (whose La Terra Trema is an inspiration) was a jury member.

In 1963, the film was nominated for "Best Film from any Source" at the 16th British Academy Film Awards.

References

External links
 
 
 
 
The Naked Island: The Silence of the Sea an essay by Haden Guest at the Criterion Collection

1960 films
Japanese black-and-white films
1960 drama films
Films directed by Kaneto Shindo
Films set on islands
Films shot in Onomichi
Films without speech
1960s Japanese-language films
Films with screenplays by Kaneto Shindo
1960s Japanese films